Dorrington is a village and civil parish in the North Kesteven district of Lincolnshire, England. It is situated  both south from Digby and north from Ruskington. It is to the east of the north–south B1188, which lies just within the parish boundaries.

In the 2001 census, the parish had a population of 340, increasing slightly to 344 at the 2011 census.

Dorrington Grade I listed Anglican church is dedicated to St James and St John. It is mainly in Decorated style. On the sides of the east window are ogee canopied niches. The church tower previously held a spire. On the exterior of the east window is a sculpture of the Last Judgment.

Frank Whittle lodged at a house in the village while developing the jet engine at RAF Cranwell; the remains of this house lie near the church. In the village are the remains of a Grade II listed Medieval ashlar cross.

The Peterborough to Lincoln Line passes to the east of the village. The village public house is the Musicians Arms on Main Street.

References

External links

"Dorrington", Genuki.org.uk. Retrieved 22 July 2011

Villages in Lincolnshire
Civil parishes in Lincolnshire
North Kesteven District